An equitable right is a legal right guaranteed by equity as opposed to a legal right which derives authority from a legal source. An example of an equitable right could be seen in Land law, where mention is made of a beneficial interest i.e. vested interests in an estate which are protected by equity. In essence, a contributor to the purchase of a property, has an equitable right to that property albeit not being the registered proprietor.

Rights